The World Group was the highest level of Davis Cup competition in 2004. The first-round losers went into the Davis Cup World Group Play-offs, and the winners progress to the quarterfinals. The quarterfinalists were guaranteed a World Group spot for 2005.

Participating Teams

Draw

First round

Australia vs. Sweden

United States vs. Austria

Belarus vs. Russia

Morocco vs. Argentina

Romania vs. Switzerland

France vs. Croatia

Netherlands vs. Canada

Czech Republic vs. Spain

Quarterfinals

United States vs. Sweden

Belarus vs. Argentina

Switzerland vs. France

Spain vs. Netherlands

Semifinals

United States vs. Belarus

Spain vs. France

Final

Spain vs. United States

References

World Group
Davis Cup World Group